Swantje Henrike Michaelsen (born 4 October 1979) is a German politician of the Alliance 90/The Greens party who has been serving as a member of the Bundestag since the 2021 German federal election.

Political career 
In the 2017 German federal election, Michaelsen ran for election in the constituency of Stadt Hannover I.

In parliament, Michaelsen serves on the Committee on Transport and the Committee on Petitions. She is her parliamentary group’s rapporteur on cycling.

Other activities 
 üstra, Member of the Supervisory Board (since 2019)

References 

Living people
1979 births
Politicians from Mainz
21st-century German politicians
21st-century German women politicians
Members of the Bundestag for Alliance 90/The Greens
Members of the Bundestag 2021–2025
Female members of the Bundestag